Ataköy is a village in the District of Haymana, Ankara Province, Turkey. This village was called Kaltakli previously.

Population  
As of 2017 there are 602 inhabitants in the village of Ataköy, down from 853 inhabitants in 1985.

The village is populated by the Kurdish Şêxbizin tribe.

References

Villages in Haymana District

Kurdish settlements in Ankara Province